The Parker River is a perennial river of the Corangamite catchment, located in the Otways region of the Australian state of Victoria.

Location and features
The Parker River rises in the Otway Ranges in southwest Victoria, near Parkers Spur and flows generally south through the Great Otway National Park before reaching its river mouth and emptying into Bass Strait, east of Cape Otway and the Cape Otway Lighthouse, near Point Franklin. From its highest point, the river descends  over its  course.

Etymology
In the Aboriginal Australian Gadubanud language the river is named Tjeerrang bundit, meaning "twigs of spear tree".

The river was given its current name by surveyor George Smythe after Amelia Parker, to whom he was later married.

See also

References

External links

 

Corangamite catchment
Rivers of Barwon South West (region)
Otway Ranges